Taylor Barnard (born 1 June 2004) is a British racing driver who is currently racing for Jenzer Motorsport in FIA Formula 3. He is the reigning ADAC Formula 4 runner-up, as well as a protégé of Formula One World Champion Nico Rosberg.

Career

Karting 
Born in Norwich, Barnard began karting in 2012 at the Trent Valley Kart Club. From there, he branched out to the Super 1 National Championship, where he would remain until his title victory in 2017. Added to that, Barnard won the Kartmasters British Grand Prix on two occasions, as well as winning the LGM Series in the IAME Cadet category.

The Briton moved onto the European stage in 2018, racing in the OK Junior class for KR Motorsport, for whom he would win the WSK Final Cup at season's end. Having become a karting protégé of Nico Rosberg and joined the Formula One World Champion's Racing Academy, Barnard progressed into the OK Senior category the following year. He would win the WSK Champions Cup at the start of the campaign, whilst coming fourth in the European Championship. That year, Barnard also finished second in the Karting World Championship, missing out narrowly to Lorenzo Travisanutto in wet conditions. Barnard remained with Rosberg Racing Academy for his final karting season in 2020, where he once again ended up as the runner-up of the World Championship, this time losing out against Callum Bradshaw. That year brought more trophies however, with Barnard taking another WSK Champions Cup crown, as well as winning the WSK Open Cup.

Lower formulae

2020 
Barnard made his car racing debut in 2020, competing in three rounds of the Italian F4 Championship for AKM Motorsport. With two points coming from the weekend at Monza, Barnard ended up 26th in the standings.

2021 
For 2021, Barnard partnered up with BWR Motorsports, a team affiliated with his mentor Nico Rosberg, to compete in the ADAC Formula 4 Championship. However, following just three rounds, in which Barnard took a best result of fourth, the team was forced to miss two events, only returning for the season finale. Because of this, the Briton finished 17th in the championship, taking 17 points.

2022 
Nevertheless, Barnard remained in Formula 4 the following year, driving for newly-formed team PHM Racing alongside Nikita Bedrin and Jonas Ried. He began the year by competing in the F4 UAE Championship in January, taking his and his team's first win in car racing at the Yas Marina Circuit. The rest of the campaign was plagued by reliability issues relating to the car, as Barnard ended up ninth overall.

Barnard's main campaign would lie in the Italian F4 and ADAC Formula 4 series, which he would once again contest with PHM. In the former, Barnard took one podium at Vallelunga Circuit and finished eighth in the standings, whilst in the latter, his campaign would be more successful. Having started out with two sixth places and a collision with teammate Ried at Spa-Francorchamps, the Briton experienced a more positive weekend in Hockenheim, taking a pair of podiums. Following more points finishes at Zandvoort, the event at the Nürburgring became a turning point for Barnard. After taking his first victory of the season in Race 1, owing to a five-second penalty to leader Andrea Kimi Antonelli for a jump start, Barnard fended off his Italian rival in Race 2, scoring another win. With championship leader Antonelli absent at the penultimate round at the Lausitzring, Barnard would capitalise, winning two races and finishing second in Race 1, in a weekend characterised by a number of battles with his teammate Nikita Bedrin. Despite this, Barnard would be unable to take the title, although another pair of podiums at the season finale, including a victory in the final race, meant that the Briton became the championship runner-up.

FIA Formula 3 
At the end of 2022, Barnard, along with his F4 teammate Nikita Bedrin and Euroformula Open driver Alex García, took part in the FIA Formula 3 Championship post-season test for Jenzer Motorsport. On 31 January 2023, Barnard was announced as the final driver for Jenzer Motorsport to complete its roster for the 2023 season, alongside Nikita Bedrin and Alex García.

Karting record

Karting career summary

Complete CIK-FIA Karting European Championship results 
(key) (Races in bold indicate pole position) (Races in italics indicate fastest lap)

Complete Karting World Championship results

Racing record

Racing career summary 

*Season still in progress.

Complete Italian F4 Championship results 
(key) (Races in bold indicate pole position) (Races in italics indicate fastest lap)

Complete ADAC Formula 4 Championship results 
(key) (Races in bold indicate pole position) (Races in italics indicate fastest lap)

Complete Formula 4 UAE Championship results 
(key) (Races in bold indicate pole position) (Races in italics indicate fastest lap)

Complete Formula Regional Middle East Championship results
(key) (Races in bold indicate pole position) (Races in italics indicate fastest lap)

 – Driver did not finish the race but was classified, as he completed more than 90% of the race distance.
* Season still in progress.

Complete FIA Formula 3 Championship results 
(key) (Races in bold indicate pole position) (Races in italics indicate fastest lap)

References

External links 
 

Living people
2004 births
British racing drivers
Italian F4 Championship drivers
ADAC Formula 4 drivers
FIA Formula 3 Championship drivers
Karting World Championship drivers
Sportspeople from Norwich
UAE F4 Championship drivers
PHM Racing drivers
Formula Regional Middle East Championship drivers
Jenzer Motorsport drivers